The Public Ministry of Nicaragua ensures effective criminal prosecution. Established in 2000, the ministry exercises vigilance and protection of society and victims of crime by promoting the investigation of criminal acts and criminal actions against offenders of the law that violate public order and security. It is an independent institution that operates via a functional and administrative organic autonomy and is subordinated only to the Political Constitution of the Republic and the laws. The Attorney General of the Republic heads the ministry.

List of attorneys general (2000–present)* 

 Julio Centeno Gomez (2000–2001)
 Oscar Herdocia Lacayo (2002–2004)
 Victor Manuel Talavera (2004-2007)
 Hernan Estrada Santamaria (2007–2018)
Ana Julia Guido Ochoa (2014–present) [1st female]

*The listing only shows the Attorneys General that served from 2000 and onward since the ministry's establishment.

See also 
 Attorneys general
 Justice ministry
 Politics of Nicaragua

References 

Attorneys general
Justice ministries
Government of Nicaragua
2000 establishments in Nicaragua